It was a Dacian fortified town.

Dacian fortresses in Covasna County
Historic monuments in Covasna County